Sa'awan is a sub-district located in Bani Hushaysh District, Sana'a Governorate, Yemen. Sa'awan had a population of 9199 according to the 2004 census.

References 

Sub-districts in Bani Hushaysh District